"Your Own Little Corner of My Heart" is a song recorded by American country music group Blackhawk.  It was released in February 1999 as the second single from the album The Sky's the Limit.  the song reached #27 on the Billboard Hot Country Singles & Tracks chart.  The song was written by Walt Aldridge and Brad Crisler.

Chart performance

References

1999 singles
1998 songs
Blackhawk (band) songs
Songs written by Walt Aldridge
Songs written by Brad Crisler
Song recordings produced by Mark Bright (record producer)
Arista Nashville singles